The singles discography of British musician and singer-songwriter Elton John consists of 140 official singles as main artist, 22 as a featured artist, as well as 56 other non-single guest appearances, 2 charity singles, and 3 other charted songs.

In 1970, a year after starting his solo career, John released his first hit single, "Your Song", which became his first top ten in both the UK and the US. His critical success was at its peak in the 1970s, when he released a streak of chart-topping singles in the US and UK, including "Tiny Dancer" (1972), "Rocket Man" (1972),  "Honky Cat" (1972), "Crocodile Rock" (1972), "Daniel' (1973), "Saturday Night's Alright for Fighting" (1973), "Goodbye Yellow Brick Road" (1973), "Step into Christmas" (1973), "Bennie and the Jets" (1974), "The Bitch Is Back" (1974), "Philadelphia Freedom" (1975), "Someone Saved My Life Tonight" (1975), and "Don't Go Breaking My Heart" (1976).

John continued his success in the 1980s and 1990s, having several hit singles including "I Guess That's Why They Call It the Blues" (1983), "I'm Still Standing" (1983), "Sad Songs (Say So Much)" (1984), "Nikita" (1985), "Sacrifice" (1989), "The One" (1992), and "Believe" (1995). In 1997, John released the double A-side single "Something About the Way You Look Tonight"/"Candle in the Wind 1997" in dedication to the memory of Diana, Princess of Wales. The single subsequently hit number one in every country that it charted in and became the biggest-selling single of all time since the UK and US charts began in the 1950s, with worldwide sales of 33 million. John has continued to record new music since then, including the singles "I Want Love" (2001), "Electricity" (2005), "Looking Up" (2015), "(I'm Gonna) Love Me Again" (2019), "Cold Heart" (2021), and "Hold Me Closer" (2022).

Throughout his career, John has sold 100 million singles worldwide, making him one of the biggest selling music artists of all time. He has had 57 top 40 hits in the United States, second only to Elvis Presley in total, with 27 of these hitting the top ten and nine reaching number one. In his native United Kingdom, John has accumulated 70 top 40 singles, including 35 top tens and 10 number ones, making him joint ninth on the list of artists with most number-one singles on the UK Singles Chart (with Calvin Harris and Eminem). In 2021, John became the first solo artist with UK Top 10 singles across six decades.

Singles

1960s

1970s

1980s

1990s

2000s

2010s

2020s

Charity singles

Other charted songs

Other appearances

See also
 Elton John albums discography
 Rock and Roll Hall of Fame
 Songwriters Hall of Fame
 List of artists who reached number one in the United States
 List of best-selling singles
 List of million-selling singles in the United Kingdom
 List of best-selling singles in the United States

Notes

References

External links

Discography
Rock music discographies
Discographies of British artists
Pop music discographies